Steve Bradshaw is a retired American soccer midfielder who played professionally in the Major Indoor Soccer League and the North American Soccer League.

In 1980, the Memphis Rogues drafted Bradshaw out of Wooddale High School.  At the end of the season the team moved to Calgary, Canada to become the Calgary Boomers.  Bradshaw played during the 1980-1981 indoor NASL season with the Boomers, but saw no game time during the 1981 outdoor season.  In 1982, he returned to Memphis to join the Memphis Americans of the Major Indoor Soccer League draft.

External links
 MISL stats

References

Living people
American soccer players
Calgary Boomers players
Memphis Americans players
Memphis Rogues players
Major Indoor Soccer League (1978–1992) players
North American Soccer League (1968–1984) indoor players
North American Soccer League (1968–1984) players
Association football midfielders
Year of birth missing (living people)